The Boudican revolt was an armed uprising by native Celtic tribes against the Roman Empire. It took place c. 60–61 AD in the Roman province of Britain, and was led by Boudica, the Queen of the Iceni. The uprising was motivated by the Romans' failure to honour an agreement they had made with her husband, Prasutagus, regarding the succession of his kingdom upon his death, and by brutal mistreatment of Boudica and her daughters by the Romans.

Although heavily outnumbered, the Roman army led by Gaius Suetonius Paulinus decisively defeated the allied tribes in a final battle which inflicted heavy losses on the Britons. The location of this battle is not known. It marked the end of resistance to Roman rule in most of the southern half of Great Britain, a period that lasted until 410 AD. Modern historians are dependent for information about the uprising and the defeat of Boudica on the narratives written by the Roman historians Tacitus and Dio Cassius, which are the only surviving accounts of the battle known to exist.

Cause of the rebellion
In 43 AD Rome invaded south-eastern Britain. The conquest was gradual, and while some native kingdoms were defeated in battle and occupied, others remained nominally independent as allies of the Roman empire.

One such tribe was the Iceni in what is now Norfolk. Their king, Prasutagus, thought he had secured his independence by leaving his lands jointly to his daughters and to the Roman emperor, Nero, in his will. However, when he died, in 61 or shortly before, his will was ignored. The Romans seized his lands and violently humiliated his family: his widow, Boudica, was flogged and her daughters raped. Roman financiers called in their loans.

Initial rebel actions 

Boudica was their leader. According to Tacitus, the rebels drew inspiration from the example of Arminius, the prince of the Cherusci who had driven the Romans out of Germany in AD 9, and their own ancestors who had driven Julius Caesar from Britain. Cassius Dio says that at the outset Boudica employed a form of divination, releasing a hare from the folds of her dress and interpreting the direction in which it ran, and invoked Andraste, a British goddess of victory.

In an imaginary speech, the Roman historian Tacitus has Boudica addressing her army with these words: "It is not as a woman descended from noble ancestry, but as one of the people that I am avenging lost freedom, my scourged body, the outraged chastity of my daughters," and concludes, "This is a woman's resolve; as for men, they may live and be slaves." Tacitus depicts Boudica as a victim of Roman slavery and licentiousness, her fight against which made her a champion of both barbarian and British liberty; and he portrays Boudica's actions as an example of the bravery of a free woman, rather than of a queen, sparing her the negative connotations associated with queenship in the ancient world.

Camulodunum
These veterans had been accused of mistreating the locals. A huge temple to the former emperor Claudius had also been erected in the city at great expense to the local population, causing much resentment. The future governor Quintus Petillius Cerialis, then commanding the Legio IX Hispana, attempted to relieve the city, but suffered an overwhelming defeat. The infantry with him were all killed and only the commander and some of his cavalry escaped. The location of this battle is unknown.

The Roman inhabitants sought reinforcements from the procurator Catus Decianus, but he sent only two hundred auxiliary troops. Boudica's army fell on the poorly defended city and destroyed it, besieging the last defenders in the temple for two days before it fell. Archaeologists have shown that the city was methodically demolished. After this disaster, Catus Decianus, whose actions had provoked the uprising, fled to Gaul.

Londinium
When news of the rebellion reached Suetonius, he hurried through hostile territory to Londinium, a relatively new settlement founded after the conquest of AD 43, which had grown to be a thriving commercial centre with a population of traders and probably Roman officials. Suetonius considered fighting the rebellious tribes there, but with his insufficient numbers of troops and chastened by Petillius's defeat, he decided to sacrifice the city to save the province and withdrew to regroup his forces.

Alarmed by this disaster and by the fury of the province which he had goaded into war by his rapacity, the procurator Catus crossed over into Gaul. Suetonius, however, with wonderful resolution, marched amidst a hostile population to Londinium, which, though undistinguished by the name of a colony, was much frequented by a number of merchants and trading vessels. Uncertain whether he should choose it as a seat of war, as he looked round on his scanty force of soldiers, and remembered with what a serious warning the rashness of Petillius had been punished, he resolved to save the province at the cost of a single town. Nor did the tears and weeping of the people, as they implored his aid, deter him from giving the signal of departure and receiving into his army all who would go with him. Those who were chained to the spot by the weakness of their sex, or the infirmity of age, or the attractions of the place, were cut off by the enemy.— Tacitus

The wealthy citizens and traders of Londinium had fled after the news of Catus Decianus defecting to Gaul. Suetonius took with him as refugees those citizens who wished to escape, and the rest of the inhabitants were left to their fate. The rebels burned Londinium, torturing and killing anyone who had not evacuated with Suetonius. Archaeology shows a thick red layer of burnt debris covering coins and pottery dating before AD 60 within the bounds of Roman Londinium; Roman-era skulls found in the Walbrook in 2013 may have been victims of the rebels. Excavations in 1995 revealed that the destruction extended across the River Thames to a suburb at the southern end of London Bridge.

Verulamium
The municipium of Verulamium (modern St Albans) was also destroyed. Archeological evidence for this event is very limited. A major excavation by Mortimer Wheeler and his wife Tessa in the early 1930s found little trace of it, perhaps because they are now known to have been working away from the area which was settled in the early Roman occupation. Another excavation by Sheppard Frere between 1957 and 1961 revealed a row of shops alongside Watling Street which had been burned at around 60 AD, but the full extent of the destruction remains unclear.

Violence perpetrated on the Roman populations
In the three settlements destroyed, between seventy and eighty thousand people are said to have been killed. Tacitus says that the Britons had no interest in taking or selling prisoners, only in slaughter by gibbet, fire, or cross. Dio's account gives more detail; that the noblest women were impaled on spikes and had their breasts cut off and sewn to their mouths, "to the accompaniment of sacrifices, banquets, and wanton behaviour" in sacred places, particularly the groves of Andraste.

Final battle

Preparations by both sides

While the Britons continued their destruction, Suetonius regrouped his forces. According to Tacitus, he amassed a force including his own Legio XIV Gemina, some vexillationes (detachments) of the XX Valeria Victrix, and any available auxiliaries.

At an unidentified location, Suetonius took a stand in a defile with a wood behind him that opened out into a wide plain. His men were heavily outnumbered: Dio says that, even if they were lined up one deep, they would not have extended the length of Boudica's line. By now the rebel forces they faced were said to have numbered 230,000–300,000, although modern historians say these numbers should be treated with scepticism. The sides of the defile protected the Roman flanks from attack and the forest impeded approach from the rear. These precautions would have prevented Boudica from bringing her considerable forces to bear on the Roman position other than from the front, and the open plain would have made surprise attack impossible. Suetonius placed his legionaries in close order, with auxilia infantry on the flanks and cavalry on the wings.

Although the Britons were gathered in considerable force, the Iceni and other tribes had been disarmed some years before the rebellion and it is thought they may have been poorly equipped. They placed their wagons at the far end of the field, from where their families could watch what they may have expected to be an overwhelming victory. Two Germanic leaders, Boiorix of the Cimbri and Ariovistus of the Suebi, are reported to have done the same thing in their battles against Gaius Marius and Caesar, respectively.

As their armies deployed, the leaders would have sought to motivate their soldiers. Tacitus, who wrote of the battle more than 50 years later, imagined Boudica's speech to her followers: 'But now,' she said, 'it is not as a woman descended from noble ancestry, but as one of the people that I am avenging lost freedom, my scourged body, the outraged chastity of my daughters. Roman lust has gone so far that not our very persons, nor even age or virginity, are left unpolluted. But heaven is on the side of a righteous vengeance; a legion which dared to fight has perished; the rest are hiding themselves in their camp, or are thinking anxiously of flight. They will not sustain even the din and the shout of so many thousands, much less our charge and our blows. If you weigh well the strength of the armies, and the causes of the war, you will see that in this battle you must conquer or die. This is a woman's resolve; as for men, they may live and be slaves.'

Tacitus also wrote of Suetonius addressing his legionaries. Although, like many historians of his day, he was given to inventing stirring speeches for such occasions, Suetonius's speech here is unusually blunt and practical. Tacitus's father-in-law, the future governor Gnaeus Julius Agricola, was on Suetonius's staff at the time and may have reported it fairly accurately.
 Ignore the racket made by these savages. There are more women than men in their ranks. They are not soldiers — they are not even properly equipped. We have beaten them before and when they see our weapons and feel our spirit, they will crack. Stick together. Throw the javelins, then push forward: knock them down with your shields and finish them off with your swords. Forget about plunder. Just win and you will have everything.

Defeat of Boudica

Boudica is imagined by Tacitus exhorting her troops from her chariot, her daughters beside her.  Before the Britons came into contact with the front line of Romans, the Roman infantry threw their pila, a type of javelin, to cut down many of the charging warriors and pierce the shields of others, forcing them to be discarded and leave the warriors exposed. When the Romans had exhausted their missiles, they advanced behind their shields in a wedge formation, wielding short stabbing swords, into the tightly-packed Britons. With their superior armour, weapons, training and discipline, the Romans had a decisive advantage in the close-quarter fighting that followed. Their cavalry entered the battle on the flanks.

As the Britons' losses increased they tried to retreat, but their flight was blocked by their wagons and they were massacred. The Romans killed not only the warriors, but also the women and children and even the pack animals. Tacitus states that 80,000 Britons fell against the loss of only 400 Romans, although the figures quoted for the campaign in ancient sources are regarded by modern historians as extravagant. The Roman slaughter of women and animals was unusual, as they could have been sold for profit. According to Tacitus:
At first, the legionaries stood motionless, keeping to the defile as a natural protection: then, when the closer advance of the enemy had enabled them to exhaust their missiles with certitude of aim, they dashed forward in a wedge-like formation. The auxiliaries charged in the same style; and the cavalry, with lances extended, broke a way through any parties of resolute men whom they encountered. The remainder took to flight, although escape was difficult, as the cordon of wagons had blocked the outlets. The troops gave no quarter even to the women: the baggage animals themselves had been speared and added to the pile of bodies. The glory won in the course of the day was remarkable, and equal to that of our older victories: for, by some accounts, little less than eighty thousand Britons fell, at a cost of some four hundred Romans killed and a not much greater number of wounded.

Poenius Postumus, whose legion had not marched to join the battle, and were thus robbed of a share of the glory, killed himself by falling on his sword.

Boudica's death 
Cassius Dio says Boudica fell ill, died and was given a lavish burial.

Boudica's burial site is unknown, and is presumably somewhere in the south of Great Britain. Modern speculations about its location lack serious evidence and have not gained consensus among archaeologists or historians. Modern myths have associated it in local tradition with Gop Hill Cairn at Trelawnyd in Flintshire, Wales. The imaginative Morien suggests that Bryn Sion in Flintshire may have been the location where Boudica died. Another legend suggests that she is buried under Platform 10 of London King's Cross railway station.

Aftermath 
The historian Gaius Suetonius Tranquillus writes that the crisis had almost persuaded Nero to abandon Britain, but with the revolt brought to a decisive end, the occupation of Britain continued. Fearing that Suetonius's punitive actions against the British tribes would provoke further rebellion, Nero replaced him with the more conciliatory Publius Petronius Turpilianus.

While the defeat of Boudica consolidated Roman rule in southern Britain, northern Britain remained volatile. In AD 69 Venutius, a Brigantes noble, was to lead another less well documented revolt, initially inspired by tribal rivalry but soon becoming anti-Roman.

Catus Decianus, who had fled to Gaul, was replaced by Gaius Julius Alpinus Classicianus. After the uprising, Suetonius conducted widespread punitive operations among the Britons, but criticism of this by Classicianus led to an investigation headed by Nero's freedman Polyclitus. No historical records tell what had happened to Boudica's two daughters.

Location of final battle 
The site of the battle was not identified by either classical historian, although Tacitus gives a brief description of it, and its location is unknown. Most modern historians favour potential location sites in the Midlands, probably along the Roman road between Londinium and Viroconium (Wroxeter) which became Watling Street.

Manduessedum (Mancetter), near the modern town of Atherstone in Warwickshire, has also been suggested, as has the area east of Rugby, Warwickshire, near the villages of Clifton-upon-Dunsmore and Hillmorton, south of Tripontium. Also suggested has been a site near Virginia Water in Surrey, between Callow Hill and Knowle Hill, off the Devil's Highway
 
Local legends offer "The Rampart" near Messing, Essex and Ambresbury Banks in Epping Forest, although these accounts are not thought to hold a factual  basis. More recently, a discovery of Roman artefacts in Kings Norton close to Metchley Camp has suggested another possibility. Considering Akeman Street as a possible route from the south-west, the Cuttle Mill area of Paulerspury in Northamptonshire, where fragments of Roman pottery from the 1st century have been found, has been suggested as a site for the battle. In 2009, it was suggested that the Iceni were returning to their lands along the Icknield Way when they encountered the Roman army in the vicinity of Arbury Banks, Hertfordshire. In March 2010, evidence was published proposing that the battle site may be located at Church Stowe, Northamptonshire.

The area of King's Cross, London was previously a village known as Battle Bridge which was an ancient crossing of the River Fleet. The original name of the bridge was Broad Ford Bridge. The name "Battle Bridge" led to a tradition that this was the site of a major battle between the Romans and the Iceni tribe led by Boudica. The tradition is not supported by any historical evidence and is rejected by modern historians, although Lewis Spence's 1937 book Boadicea – warrior queen of the Britons went so far as to include a map showing the positions of the opposing armies.

A travel writer in the 18th century, Thomas Pennant, suggested that a hill named "Bryn Paulin", on which the north Wales town of St Asaph stood, may have been so called because Paulinus and his troops made a camp on their way to or from Mona (Anglesey). A later writer, Richard Williams Morgan, described as "patriotically fanatical, a man who drew creative inspiration from his inexhaustible capacity for self-deception", imaginatively "turned a collection of unrelated local landmarks into the narrative of a desperate battle", in which, among other details, he cited as evidence a "Stone of the Grave of Vuddig". Boudica's last battle was placed on the Wyddelian road at Trelawnyd (previously Newmarket) in Flintshire. Morien suggests that Boudica was supported by Celts who were enraged at the killing of druids on Mona and  moved towards the Roman force in North Wales, with battle possibly ensuing at Trelawnyd.

Relics
A bronze head found in Suffolk in 1907, now in the British Museum, was probably struck from a statue of Nero during the revolt.

References

External links
  BBC: Boudica's Revolt Video

Boudica
60s in the Roman Empire
60s conflicts
1st-century rebellions
1st century in Roman Britain
Iceni
Rebellions against the Roman Empire
Women in 1st-century warfare
Women in ancient European warfare
Women in war in Britain
Wars involving the Roman Empire
1st century
Boudica
Boudica
Military history of Roman Britain
Boudica